This article contains information about the literary events and publications of 1784.

Events
March – Gottlieb Jakob Planck becomes professor of theology at Göttingen.
April 27 – First public performance of Pierre Beaumarchais's comedy The Marriage of Figaro as La Folle Journée, ou Le Mariage de Figaro at the Théâtre de l'Odéon in Paris. It runs for 68 consecutive performances, earning higher box-office receipts than any other French play of the century. It is translated into English by Thomas Holcroft and, under the title The Follies of a Day, or The Marriage of Figaro, is produced at the Theatre Royal, Covent Garden in London by the end of the year.
June 26 – Friedrich Schiller delivers a paper, Die Schaubühne als eine moralische Anstalt betrachtet (The Theatre considered as a Moral Institution), to the palatine "Deutschen Gesellschaft".
September 1 – Germaine de Staël flees from the French Revolution to Coppet Castle in Switzerland, where she forms a salon.
unknown date – The Didot typeface is devised and cut by Firmin Didot in Paris.

New books

Fiction
Anonymous – Dangerous Connections (translation of Les Liaisons dangereuses)
Robert Bage – Barham Downs
Eliza Bromley – Laura and Augustus: an Authentic Story
William Combe – Original Love-letters
William Godwin 
Damon and Delia
Italian Letters
Thomas Holcroft – Tales of the Castle
Johann Karl August Musäus – Volksmärchen der Deutschen (third volume)
Betje Wolff and Aagje Deken – Historie van den heer Willem Leevend (1784–85)

Children
Ellenor Fenn (anonymous, "By a Lady") – The Female Guardian. Designed to correct some of the foibles incident to girls, and supply them with innocent amusement for their hours of leisure
Dorothy Kilner – Anecdotes of a Boarding School, or an Antidote to the Vices of Those Establishments

Drama
George Colman the Younger – Two to One
Hannah Cowley
A Bold Stroke for a Husband
More Ways Than One (performed 1783)
Richard Cumberland
The Carmelite
The Natural Son
William Hayley – 
 Lord Russell
 The Two Connoisseurs
Thomas Holcroft – The Follies of the Day (translation of Pierre Beaumarchais's )
Elizabeth Inchbald – Mogul Tale
Robert Jephson – The Campaign
Friedrich Schiller – Intrigue and Love (Kabale und Liebe)

Poetry

Anonymous – Rolliad
Mary Alcock – The Air Balloon
Richard Jago – Poems
Hannah More – The Bas Bleu, or, Conversation
Anna Seward – Louisa
Charlotte Turner Smith – Elegaic Sonnets
Helen Maria Williams – Peru

Non-fiction
Hannah Adams – A View of Religions
Thomas Astle – The Origin and Progress of Writing
George Berkeley – Works
Edmund Burke – Speech on the East India Bill
Thomas Chatterton – Supplement to the Miscellanies
James Cook – A Voyage to the Pacific Ocean
George Bubb Dodington – Diary
Antoine Court de Gébelin – Le Monde primitif (publication completed)
William Godwin – Sketches of History
Samuel Horsley – Letters from the Archdeacon of St. Albans
Immanuel Kant – What is Enlightenment?
William Mitford – The History of Greece
Antoine de Rivarol – Sur l'Universalité de la langue française
Ebenezer Sibly – A New and Complete Illustration of the Celestial Science of Astrology (publication commences)
Emanuel Swedenborg – A Hieroglyphic Key to Natural and Spiritual Arcana by Way of Representation and Correspondences (published, written in 1741).
Michel Augustin Thouret – Recherches et doutessur le magnétisme animal
John Wesley – The Sunday Service of the Methodists
Arthur Young – Annals of Agriculture

Births
January 31 – Bernard Barton, English Quaker poet (died 1849)
February 20 – Adam Black, Scottish publisher (died 1874)
May 12 – James Sheridan Knowles, Irish actor and dramatist (died 1862)
May 21 – Ernst Raupach, German dramatist (died 1852)
May 18 – William Tennant, Scottish poet (died 1848)
August 21 – Charlotta Berger, Swedish poet and novelist (died 1852)
September 25 – Louisa Gurney Hoare (née Louisa Gurney), English diarist and writer on education (died 1836)
October 16 – Wilhelm Nienstädt, Prussian educator and writer (died 1862)
October 19 – Leigh Hunt, English critic, essayist, poet (died 1859)
November 17 – Julia Nyberg (née Svärdström), Swedish poet (died 1854)

Deaths
January 17 – Yosa Buson, Japanese poet and painter (born 1716)
January 30 – John Holt, American publisher (born 1721)
April 24 – Franciszek Bohomolec, Polish dramatist, linguist, and theatrical reformer (born 1720)
July 31 – Denis Diderot, French philosopher, art critic, and writer (born 1713)
December 5 – Phillis Wheatley, first published African-American female poet (born 1753)
December 13 – Samuel Johnson, English poet, critic, biographer and lexicographer (born 1709)
unknown date – Lê Quý Đôn, Vietnamese philosopher, poet and encyclopedist (born 1726)

References

 
Years of the 18th century in literature